The National Tertiary Education Union (NTEU) is an Australian trade union for all higher education and university employees. It is an industry union, and the only union working exclusively in the Australian university sector.

Overview 
NTEU is a specialist national union solely representing staff in tertiary education.  In all Australian universities, NTEU represents professional staff, academic staff, research staff, general staff, ELICOS teachers, and staff of Student Unions and university companies.  In Victoria, NTEU also represents TAFE general staff and all staff in Adult Education.

NTEU is a relatively recent union, formed out of previous tertiary education staff associations, principally the Federation of University Staff Associations and the Federation of College Academics. It is generally considered to be more towards the left of the union movement, and has a high focus on self-directed membership branches and the organising model of unionism. The NTEU often engages in organising campaigns to build its membership density.

The NTEU is not affiliated with any Australian political party.

Campaigns 
Our Universities Matter is a major national campaign being run by NTEU, launched in 2008.

The campaign seeks to:

 Achieve higher levels of government funding and better funding mechanisms.
 Protect university independence and freedom of inquiry.
 Introduce controls on excessive workloads, better job security and a competitive pay rise for university staff.
 Win a better deal for students around affordability and improved student services.

Academic Freedom Watch is a site established to promote academic freedom in Australia's universities. Created by the Victorian Division, the site includes debates and articles written by high-profile academics in this area.

Our TAFEs Matter is the campaign to promote Victoria's TAFE system, which is being undermined by changes in funding systems by the Victorian Government. The changes would introduce a HECS-style loan scheme, more than double student fees and reduce public TAFE funding certainty.

Sentry

Introduction 
Sentry is NTEU's online magazine for all members during the pandemic. It is published monthly between issues of Advocate. It contains updates on campaigns and policy work, member stories and information from member experts.

Publications 
The NTEU publishes:

 Advocate – a triannual members' journal
 Australian Universities' Review – a biennual scholarly journal
 Agenda – an annual women's magazine
 Connect – a biennual magazine for university casuals

References

External links 

 Official website
 AIRC decision allowing the NTEU to represent general staff

Trade unions in Australia
Tertiary education trade unions
Education-related professional associations
Trade unions established in 1993
1993 establishments in Australia